Fengshan is a town in Jinggu Dai and Yi Autonomous County, Yunnan, China.

Administrative division
As of 2016, the town is divided into twelve villages: 
Manglong
Pingzhai
Bailin
Wenzhu
Wenshao
Baomu
Wenhai
Wenzhe
Shunnan
Banban
Pingtian
Haiqing

History
In 1725, in the ruling of Yongzheng Emperor the Qing dynasty (1644–1911), it came under the jurisdiction of Xuanhua Tusi. In 1774, in the reign of Qianlong Emperor, the Weiyuan Department was set up.

After the founding of the Republic of China (1912-1949), in 1913, it belonged to the Xuanhua Township of Weiyuan County. On September 30, 1940, its name was changed to "Fengshan District" and then renamed "Fengshan Township" in the following year.

On August 1, 1949, the Provisional People's Government of Fengshan District was established. In 1952, it was renamed "Fengshan Township". During the Great Leap Forward, it was renamed "Fengshan People's Commune" in October 1958. It was incorporated as a township in January 1988.

Geography
The town is located in northeastern Jinggu Dai and Yi Autonomous County. It is surrounded by Zhenyuan Yi, Hani and Lahu Autonomous County on the northwest, Jinggu Town on the west, Pu'er City on the east, and the towns of Zhengxing and Weiyuan on the south.

The highest point is Dajian Mountain, elevation .

The Weiyuan River flows through the town.

Economy
The region's economy is based on agriculture and animal husbandry. Significant crops include rice, wheat, corn, and bean. Economic crops are mainly sugarcane, tobacco, tea, coffee, fruit, vegetable, natural rubber, and Juglans sigillata. The region also has an abundance of copper and iron.

Demographics

As of 2020, the National Bureau of Statistics of China estimates the town's population now to be 21,752.

Tourist attractions
Fengshan is a favourite tourist destination, especially renowned for its hot spring.

Transportation
The Provincial Highway S222 is a north–south highway in the town.

References

Bibliography

Divisions of Jinggu Dai and Yi Autonomous County